Kevin Delaney is an American voice actor, who is best known for voicing Edna Mode in Disney Infinity, Captain Marvel in Mortal Kombat vs. DC Universe and Ryuji Keikain in Nura: Rise of the Yokai Clan: Demon Capital. He also provided additional voices for Looney Tunes: Stranger Than Fiction, Looney Tunes: Reality Check, and Lightning Returns: Final Fantasy XIII.

Filmography

Anime
 Nura: Rise of the Yokai Clan - Demon Capital - Ryuji Keikain (2013)

Video games
 Agatha Christie: Evil Under the Sun - Hercule Poirot
 Anvil of Dawn - Court Magician, Book Thing, Second in Command
 Chronomaster - Fortune Teller
 Disney's Chicken Little: Ace in Action - Space Goosey Lucy
 Disney Infinity - Edna Mode
 Dracula: Origin - Abraham Van Helsing, Dracula
 Earth Defense Force 2025 - Soldier
 Experience112 - Mike Loyd
 Galactic Bowling - Sasquatch
 Kingdom Hearts II - Tournament Announcer
 Lightning Returns: Final Fantasy XIII - Additional Voices
 Math Blaster: Master the Basics - Cyclotron X, Tribal Leader, Announcer
 The Matrix: Path of Neo - Theater Heckler, SWAT, Army Soldier
 Mortal Kombat vs. DC Universe - Captain Marvel
 Sanitarium - Scotty Havel, Hector Vasquez, Frank Rizzo, Ometoch, Priest, Newscaster
 Tarr Chronicles - Captain Eric Heriot
 Watchmen: The End Is Nigh - Mercenary
 World of Warcraft: Wrath of the Lich King - Varos Cloudstrider, Skarvald the Constructor, Slad'ran, XT-002 Deconstructor

Other
 Search For the Lost Giants - Narrator
 Looney Tunes - Various

Movies
 50 Ways to Leave Your Lover - Daniel
 Sister Sarah's Sky - Pool Boy
 Soar into the Sun - Major Lee

Shorts
 The Landing - Radio Presenter

Live shows
 Disney on Ice - Edna Mode (Disneyland Adventure)

References

External links
 
 
 
 

1972 births
Living people
American male video game actors
American male voice actors
Male actors from Pittsburgh